The fourth season of the reality television series Love & Hip Hop: Miami first aired on VH1 from  August 23, 2021 until October 17, 2022. The show was primarily filmed in Miami, Florida. It is executive produced by Mona Scott-Young and Stephanie R. Gayle for Monami Productions and Lashan Browning, Donna Edge-Rachell, Paris Bauldwin, Daniel Wiener, Brian Schornak, Eric Cyphers and Markus Burns for New Group Productions. Sitarah Pendelton and Phakiso Collins are executive producers for VH1.

The series chronicles the lives of several women and men in the Miami area, involved in hip hop music. It consists of 25 episodes, including a reunion special hosted by Tamar Braxton.

Production
Filming for season four of Love & Hip Hop: Miami began in May 2021. The show made headlines in June 2021, when Ace Hood's baby mama Shanice Tyria, outed him as a cast member on the show during a dispute over child support payments.

On August 9, 2021, after over a year long hiatus, VH1 announced the show's return for a  fourth season, which premiered on August 23, 2021. New cast members include Ace Hood and his wife Shelah Marie, Noreaga and his wife Neri, and Florence El Luche, with Bobby Lytes demoted to supporting cast, along with Florence's sister Gaelle and husband Marlon, Suki's fiancé Kill Bill and cousin Isaiah, Trina's boyfriend Raymond Taylor and manager C.O. Love & Hip Hop: Hollywood Ray J and Princess Love make crossover appearances.

The season was preceded by the special Love & Hip Hop Miami: Inside the 305 on August 16, 2021.

On July 11, 2022, VH1 announced that additional episodes will air from August 8, 2022. Ace and Shelah were removed from the opening credits, while Shay Johnson and her brother Emjay returned to the cast, with Trina's brother Snoop, Suki's manager Jay Kelly, Shay's business partner Jullian Boothe and Shay and Emjay's mother Sandra Sims in supporting roles. Love & Hip Hop: Atlanta Momma Dee makes a crossover appearance.

Synopsis

Cast

Part 1
Starring

 Amara La Negra (9 episodes)
 Trick Daddy (7 episodes)
 Sukihana (9 episodes)
 Florence El Luche (7 episodes)
 Ace Hood (10 episodes)
 Shelah Marie (11 episodes)
 Noreaga (7 episodes)
 Neri Santiago (7 episodes)
 Trina (11 episodes) 
Also starring
 Joy Young (8 episodes)
 Ray J (4 episodes)
 Gaelle Jacques (6 episodes)
 Kill Bill (8 episodes)
 Bobby Lytes (9 episodes)
 Raymond Taylor (8 episodes)
 Miami Tip (3 episodes)
 Princess Love (5 episodes)
 C.O. Piscapo (6 episodes)
 Marlon Dure (7 episodes)
 Isaiah Henderson (4 episodes)

Part 2
Starring

 Amara La Negra (10 episodes)
 Trick Daddy (9 episode)
 Sukihana (10 episodes)
 Florence El Luche (11 episodes)
 Noreaga (5 episodes)
 Neri Santiago (3 episodes)
 Trina (9 episodes) 
Also starring
 Joy Young (7 episodes)
 Princess Love (6 episodes)
 Bobby Lytes (6 episodes)
 One Snoop Monzta (6 episodes)
 Raymond Taylor (6 episodes)
 Marlon Dure (9 episodes)
 Gaelle Jacques (9 episodes)
 Emjay Johnson (7 episodes)
 Shay Johnson (9 episodes)
 Isaiah Henderson (4 episodes)
 Kill Bill (9 episodes)
 Momma Dee (3 episodes)
 Ray J (6 episodes)
 Jay Kelly (3 episodes)
 Jullian Boothe (5 episodes)
 Sandra Sims (8 episodes)

DJ EFN, Timbaland, Swizz Beatz, LunchMoney Lewis and Amara's mother Mami Ana appear in guest roles. Love & Hip Hop: Atlantas Yung Joc and Spice, and Love & Hip Hop: New Yorks Kaylin Garcia make crossover appearances.

Episodes

References

External links

2021 American television seasons
2022 American television seasons
Love & Hip Hop